The Otley Run is a pub crawl in Leeds, West Yorkshire. The route shares much in common with the Headingley Mile (a similar crawl in LS6) but usually incorporating more pubs on the A660 road, typically those towards Leeds City Centre.

The Otley Run is seen as a rite of passage for students visiting or studying at Leeds and participants often wear fancy dress, coordinating their costumes to a particular theme. It is a popular social gathering for student clubs and societies from The University of Leeds, Leeds College of Music, Leeds Arts University, Leeds Trinity University, Leeds Beckett University and The University of Bradford Hockey Club. It also a common activity for birthdays and other celebrations among graduates and city residents. Participants also include students of Leeds Grammar School, Lawnswood School, Roundhay School, Notre Dame Sixth Form College, Guiseley School, Horsforth School, St Mary's School and Abbey Grange Academy Sixth Form to do the Otley Run on their last day, as well as students from Otley's Prince Henry's Grammar School Sixth Form, with their run usually including various pubs and bars around Otley as well as the Headingley Mile venues.

The enduring popularity of the Otley Run has inspired beer bottle designs, a verse novella, and artwork depicting the venues and scenery on the route.

History of the route
Early incarnations of the Otley Run route covered considerably more of the Otley Road and followed it closely. Influences on the choice of route over time include:

 The original "Otley run", in which out-of-town pubs were opened for farmers' business use under provisions of the Licensing Act 1964. This gave Otley pubs favourable hours on market days, set out in relevant byelaws as on Monday and Friday
 Tetley's incredible popularity and copious Yorkshire pubs, including The Oak Inn (Original Oak) and a brewhouse at The Woodman (Woodies)
 Students being able to include bars on University of Leeds and LMU union premises (which for a time were members' clubs and required membership cards to enter), and on-site at residences such as Bodington Hall
 Student sports societies and former Bodington residents including main road pubs around Adel/Weetwood/Far Headingley such as The Stables at Weetwood Hall (and similarly for venues near other popular residences over time)
 Changes in permissible afternoon and evening opening hours encouraging new bars to open in the "Headingley Mile" section and enhancing the appeal of bars and clubs at the city centre end of the main road
 Advice from hen/stag party planners and fancy dress shops advising customers on which pubs to visit, and from letting agents seeking to attract students with written articles about the local area.
 Commercial interest from discount card providers looking to get their associated venues "on the route" and viral marketing campaigns involving Twitter feeds and web sites publishing route maps claiming to be official

The tradition of starting an Otley Run early predates The Licensing Act 1988's repeal of the law requiring pubs to close in the afternoon.
Prior to this, Otley's status as a thriving market town having given it exemption from this law made it popular with drinkers.
For students, an Otley Road pub crawl might run to or from University Union premises and include residential cafeteria facilities and nearby Tetley pubs or the Bodington Hall on-site bar.

As city centre pubs began to adopt the new longer opening hours,  the northern end point of the Otley Run route crept into Adel, Lawnswood, and Weetwood in keeping with the proximity of student residences such as Devonshire Hall, Bodington Hall, and Oxley. Starting around the ring road junction was also popular with student sports societies thanks to Bodington's playing fields, Sports Park Weetwood, and location of The Stables (at University-owned Weetwood Hall). Woodhouse Lane/Albion Street bars and city centre clubs offered end points for south-bound runs should drinkers not qualify as members or guests as required for access to student union bars at the time. This journey would therefore pass or approach such sites as the University playing fields at Bodington Hall/Weetwood Pavilion, as well as Carnegie stadium, Castle Grove Masonic Lodge, Associated Tower Cinemas' famous Lounge and Cottage Road cinemas, the site of the Skyrack wapentake Shire Oak (now commemorated with a blue plaque at the Original Oak), Woodhouse Ridge, the site of Leeds Girls' High School, and Woodhouse Moor/Hyde Park.

With Headingley's student population growing and the eventual closure of the halls at Weetwood, Cavendish, Tetley, and Bodington in favour of alternatives in and around city centre, the common route ceased inclusion of central Weetwood and beyond, taking inspiration from the crawl associated with the Headingley Mile (the section of the A660 from the Hyde Park Hotel to the New Inn) which usually headed south from Woodies' Ale House; Woodies' (originally The Woodman, and technically in Far Headingley) was also conveniently close to the boundary served by cheap "Green Zone" bus tickets. Newly opened pubs such as the converted Lounge cinema (Headingley) and Dry Dock (Woodhouse) were adopted to fill the gaps on the list, and many city centre bars and club nights began to jostle for position as the official end point.

The idea that followers of the modern run should start early and visit as many venues as possible rather than cover a greater area has caused upset with locals  and prompted some pubs to set up an informal warning network aimed at turning away visitors in fancy dress and in obvious large groups. Crackdowns on commercial interest in the Otley Run have been proposed and University accreditation schemes have also threatened to look unfavourably on heavily promoted pub crawl events in general. In 2014 the Home Office proposed an Alcohol Impact Scheme aimed at student drinking with support from the NUS. By 2022, the central focus of complaints had shifted from student sports societies to former students and visiting stag parties.

Following an appeal to the original licensing rejection for conversion of the former Elinor Lupton Centre to The Golden Beam, an updated application was accepted which stated that participants in the Otley Run would be refused entry.

Other university pub crawls

Subcrawl, Glasgow Subway
 Smithdown Road, Liverpool, Liverpool
King Street Run, Cambridge

References

Pub crawls
Headingley